Ethen Frank (born February 5, 1998) is an American professional ice hockey center for the Hershey Bears in the American Hockey League (AHL), while under contract to the Washington Capitals of the National Hockey League (NHL). He was an All-American for Western Michigan in 2022.

Playing career
Frank spent several years playing junior hockey near his home town in the Omaha Lancers system. In his final year of 16-and-under play, he averaged more than two points per game in three separate leagues and made a brief appearance in the USHL. During his senior year in high school, Frank became a full-time member of the Lincoln Stars, playing against men who were 2- or 3-years older. He put up decent numbers that season but came into his own after graduating. He finished second on the team in both goals and points and ended his junior career by accepting a scholarship at Western Michigan.

Similar to what had occurred in the USHL, Frank took a while to get up to the speed of the NCAA game. He produced modest numbers as a freshman but rounded into form as a sophomore. Frank saw a bit of a regression during his junior season but both he and the Broncos suffered a terrible fate when the season was cut short due to the COVID-19 pandemic. In what was supposed to be his fourth and final season with the program, Frank had to wait nearly two months to play his first game. When he did, however, he began scoring at an increased pace and ended up leading the team with 13 goals in just 24 games. Unfortunately, the team did not fare well during the strange year and finished 6th in the conference standings.

Because the NCAA had already announced that it would not count the 2021 season towards the 4-year limit for player eligibility, Frank was able to return for a 5th season with Western Michigan. From the start of the season, everything seemed to align for WMU including the torrent of goals provided by Frank. He helped the Broncos put together an enviable record and ensure the team a spot in the NCAA tournament. He distinguished himself by leading the nation with 26 goals and was named an AHCA West Second Team All-American. Though the Broncos fell in the NCHC Championship game, reaching the conference final enabled Western Michigan to receive a #1 seed and a favorable draw in the regional semifinals. Frank's final collegiate point came on the game's opening goal which turned out to be vital for the Broncos as the game eventually went into overtime. Less than two minutes into the extra session, Frank was on the ice with the rest of the Broncos, celebrating the first NCAA tournament victory in program history. Though the team's season ended one game later, that did not diminish what Frank had accomplished with the Broncos. He was able to parlay his collegiate success into a professional contract and signed with the Hershey Bears.

After leading both the Bears and all AHL rookies in goals during the 2022–23 season, Frank was signed to a one-year, two-way contract by the Washington Capitals on March 2, 2023.

Career statistics

Awards and honours

References

External links

1998 births
Living people
AHCA Division I men's ice hockey All-Americans
American men's ice hockey centers
Hershey Bears players
Lincoln Stars players
Ice hockey people from Nebraska
People from Papillion, Nebraska
Western Michigan Broncos men's ice hockey players